Puravadayanar River is a branch river of Cauvery River in India. It flows through Karaikal district. It joins the Bay of Bengal near Karaikal Port.

References

Rivers of Puducherry
Rivers of Tamil Nadu
Rivers of India